John A. Hall  (born 1949) is the James McGill Emeritus Professor of Comparative Historical Sociology at McGill University, Montreal. He is the  author or editor of over 30 books.

Education and Previous Posts
Hall graduated from the Oxford University in 1970.He received his MA from the Pennsylvania State University in 1972 and has completed his PhD at the London School of Economics in 1976.

He has held previous posts at Southampton University, the London School of Economics and Harvard University.
He was an Invited Fellow at the Swedish Collegium for Advanced Studies in the Social Sciences (SCASSS) in Uppsala, Sweden, during the 1999-2000 academic year, Visiting Research Professor (1999-2002) at Queen's University in Belfast, and the Fowler Hamilton Fellow at Christ Church College, Oxford in 2003. He has been an Honorary Professor of Sociology and Politics at the University of Copenhagen since 2001. He served as Dean of the Faculty of Arts 2003-2005.

Honours
In 2012, Hall was named a Fellow of the Royal Society of Canada. The RSC also presented him with the Innis-Gérin Medal in 2016.

Selected publications

(2021) The World of States, Co-author J. Campbell, Second Revised Edition, Cambridge: Cambridge University Press.
(2021) What Capitalism Needs: Forgotten Lessons of Great Economists, Co-author John Campbell, Cambridge University Press.
(2017) The Paradox of Vulnerability: States, Nationalism and the Financial Crisis (Princeton University Press).
(2013) The Importance of Being Civil. Princeton University Press. 
(2013) Nationalism and War, edited with Sinisa Malesevic. Cambridge University Press. 
(2010) Ernest Gellner: An Intellectual Biography. Verso. 
(2006) An Anatomy of Power: The Social Theory of Michael Mann, edited with Ralph Schroeder. Cambridge University Press. 
(2006) National Identity and the Varieties of Capitalism: The Danish Experience. edited with John L. Campbell and Ove Kaj Pedersen. McGill-Queen's University Press. 
(2005) Civil Society: A Reader, edited with Frank Trentmann. Palgrave Macmillan. 
(2005) Historical Methods in the Social Sciences, edited with Joseph M. Bryant. Sage. 4 vols. 
(2003) The Nation-State in Question, edited with T. V. Paul and John Ikenberry. Princeton University Press. 
(1999) International Order and the Future of World Politics, edited with T. V. Paul. Cambridge University Press. 
(1999) Is America Breaking Apart?, with Charles Lindholm. Princeton University Press. 
(1998) The State of the Nation: Ernest Gellner and the Theory of Nationalism. Cambridge University Press. 
(1996) The Social Philosophy of Ernest Gellner, edited with I. C. Jarvie. Rodopi.
(1996) International Orders. Polity Press.
(1995) Civil Society: Theory, History, Comparison. Polity Press.
(1994) Coercion and Consent: Studies on the Modern State. Polity Press.

References

External links
 Biographical note
 Theorwellprize.co.uk/

1949 births
Living people
Fellows of the Royal Society of Canada
Scholars of nationalism
Scholars of war
Loomis Chaffee School alumni